Nexon Co., Ltd. is a Japanese-South Korean video game publisher. It publishes titles including MapleStory, Dungeon&Fighter, Sudden Attack, and KartRider. Headquartered in Japan, the company has offices located in South Korea, the United States, Taiwan and Thailand.

Nexon was founded in Seoul, South Korea in 1994 by Kim Jung-ju and Jake Song. In 2005, the company moved its headquarters to Tokyo, Japan. The company's largest shareholder is the investment firm NXC, also founded by Jung-ju.

History 
Nexon (originally Korean: 주식회사 넥슨) was established in Seoul, South Korea on December 26, 1994. It developed and published its first title, Nexus: The Kingdom of the Winds, in 1996, which the company continues to service. Numerous other games followed such as Dark Ages: Online Roleplaying, Elemental Saga, QuizQuiz, KartRider, Elancia, and Shattered Galaxy; some of which are maintained by a company spun off of Nexon, Kru Interactive. In 2003, Wizet developed MapleStory in Korea, which later became one of its most successful titles and has been serviced for more than a decade. The game was localized for Japan, China, Taiwan, Thailand, Singapore, North America, Europe, Brazil, and Vietnam. Nexon is also the developer of Dungeon & Fighter, through its wholly owned subsidiary, Neople. Dungeon & Fighter is one of the most popular free-to-play online PC games in China. In April 2013, the programmer "DrUnKeN ChEeTaH" was sued by Nexon America for operating GameAnarchy, a popular subscription based cheat provider for Combat Arms. Nexon was awarded $1.4M in damages.

Nexon went public on the Tokyo Stock Exchange on December 14, 2011, in an initial public offering, the largest in Japan for 2011 and the second largest by a technological company for 2011 worldwide. On March 9, 2016, Nexon acquired Big Huge Games, a mobile game developer in Maryland. In October 2018, a labor union was established at Nexon.

On January 3, 2019, the Korea Economic Daily reported Nexon founder Kim Jung-ju and associates have put their 98.64-percent stake up for sale. However, on July 8, 2019, Reuters reported the plan was abandoned. On November 25, 2019, The Lego Group announced the acquisition of Bricklink, the world's largest Lego fan community from Nexon, for an unknown price, which is expected to finish before the end of 2019.

On June 2, 2020, Nexon announced plans to invest $1.5 billion in listed entertainment companies. By March 2021, Nexon had deployed $874 million of that amount on investments into Hasbro, Bandai Namco Holdings, Konami, and Sega Sammy Holdings. Nexon stated that they have no interest in outright acquiring or taking activist investor positions in these companies. Nexon signed with Bandai Namco Holdings, Square Enix and Microsoft for a 10-year Japanese–South Korean video gaming partnership contract for media franchises through 2032, for example HoPals Echoes crossover project.

In a 2021 earnings call, Nexon CEO Owen Mahoney declined to offer hard launch targets for highly anticipated games. In February 2021, Nexon announced significant pay increases for new and existing development talent in the company’s Korean studios. In July 2021, Nexon announced the formation of Nexon Film and Television, a division of the company focused on expanding the reach and value of Nexon's global IP, as well as development of new properties in both interactive and linear entertainment. The division is based in Los Angeles. In January 2022, Russo brothers-owned film production company AGBO sold a $400 million minority stake to Nexon, which is valued at $1.1 billion as Nexon takes a 38% stake. In February 2022, it was reported by Bloomberg that Saudi Arabian-based Public Investment Fund had purchased just over a 5% stake in Capcom and Nexon, reportedly worth $883 USD million, while American investment company KKR acquired an 8.5% stake.

Organization 
Nexon maintains various offices around the world that engage in the publishing and/or development of Nexon's games. Each region's local consolidated subsidiaries are independently managed and are responsible for developing their own strategy for their products and services. The subsidiary that publishes a game does not necessarily indicate the region(s) that a game is available in. For example, some of Nexon Korea's games are published directly by Nexon Korea yet are available worldwide with no separate service published under the local consolidated company's portfolio.

Free-to-Play Online Virtual Worlds 

Nexon is a pioneer in free-to-play online Virtual World games which operate in contrast to games that require a large initial payment and offer a comparatively short life cycle. Nexon’s Virtual Worlds make use of live, in-game operations to provide ongoing content and manage service. Nexon Live Operations helps engage players over years and, in some cases, decades.

Multiple Nexon Virtual Worlds are among the world’s most valuable entertainment franchises:

Games for Mobile and Consoles 

Nexon began as a developer and publisher of PC games. However, in 2020, the company announced plans to begin releasing both console and mobile versions of key franchises. CEO Owen Mahoney noted that expansion onto the two popular platforms “collectively represent an order-of-magnitude increase in our total addressable market.”

In July 2020, the South Korean launch of The Kingdom of the Winds: Yeon for mobile was the top grossing title on the Apple App story and #2 on Google Play, 24 years after the launch of the initial The Kingdom of the Winds game in 1996. In August 2020, the highly-anticipated release of Dungeon&Fighter Mobile in China generated more than 60 million pre-registrations before it was delayed. In March 2022, Dungeon&Fighter Mobile was released in South Korea, reaching the #1 spot on both the App Store and Google Play.

It has already announced it will be publishing ARC Raiders, The First Decendant, Project AK and KartRider: Drift for both PlayStation 4 and Xbox. Nexon previously published one title for PlayStation 4 in 2017, Lawbreakers from Boss Key Productions.

Expansion in Western Markets 
Nexon operates in over 190 countries, but revenue and consumer engagement are concentrated in Asian markets. In 2021, the company announced a series of games in development for global release – with a focus on Europe and North America.  

 KartRider: Drift – A new multiplayer kart-racing party game, delivers drift-racing action, multiple game modes, deep player-created Kart options and character customization.
 The First Descendant – A free-to-play, third-person cooperative action RPG shooter which allows players to act as Descendents who inherit and develop powers to fight against alien invaders.  Players compete individually or in 4-player co-ops.
 ARC Raiders –From Embark Studios in Stockholm, Sweden, a free-to-play, reimagined, cooperative third shooter that offers an intense struggle in every session: together with your squad, defend our home and resist the onslaught of ARC – a ruthless mechanized threat descending from space.
 The FINALS – From Embark Studios in Stockholm, Sweden, this is a free-to-play, team-based, first-person shooter that puts dynamism, physicality, and destruction front and center.

Games

See also 
 Nexon Computer Museum

References

External links 
 Nexon Korea corporate website 
 Nexon Japan corporate website 
 Official website 
 Official website 

 
2011 initial public offerings
Chaebol
Companies based in Seoul
Companies listed on the Tokyo Stock Exchange
Japanese companies established in 1994
Kohlberg Kravis Roberts companies
Mass media companies based in Tokyo
Multinational companies headquartered in Japan
Multinational companies headquartered in South Korea
Public Investment Fund
Publishing companies established in 1994
Software companies based in Tokyo
South Korean companies established in 1994
Video game companies established in 1994
Video game companies of South Korea
Video game development companies
Video game publishers